Shirvan Mahalleh (also Romanized as Shīrvān Maḩalleh) is a village in Baladeh Rural District, Khorramabad District, Tonekabon County, Mazandaran Province, Iran. At the 2006 census, its population was 250, in 72 families.

See also 
 Ban Shirvan
 Bi Bi Shirvan
 Karkhaneh-ye Qand-e Shirvan
 Now Shirvan Kola
 Shirvan
 Shirvan County
 Shirvan, Iran
 Shirvan, Lorestan
 Shirvan Rural District
 Shirvan District
 Shirvan Shahlu

References 

Populated places in Tonekabon County